The 3 arrondissements of the Loiret department are:
 Arrondissement of Montargis, (subprefecture: Montargis) with 125 communes. The population of the arrondissement was 170,285 in 2016.  
 Arrondissement of Orléans, (prefecture of the Loiret department: Orléans) with 121 communes.  The population of the arrondissement was 440,562 in 2016.  
 Arrondissement of Pithiviers, (subprefecture: Pithiviers) with 79 communes.  The population of the arrondissement was 63,483 in 2016.

History

In 1800 the arrondissements of Orléans, Gien, Montargis and Pithiviers were established. The arrondissements of Gien and Pithiviers were disbanded in 1926, and Pithiviers was restored in 1942.

References

Loiret